Ballena Marine National Park, is a National Park of Costa Rica, part of the Osa Conservation Area created as a safe area for humpback whale migration, hence its name, as  is the Spanish word for whale.

The national park has an area of  marine, and  terrestrial.  The park was created by executive decree Nº 21294-MIRENEM on 9 June 1992.

From December to April, the park is visited by migrating humpback whales who come to breed in the warmer tropical waters off the Central American coast.  From June to November, the whales migrate north to the West Coast of the United States and southern British Columbia, where they feed. 

In the terrestrial area of the park there are the beaches of Ballena beach, Uvita bay beach and Piñuela beach.

References

Nature reserves in Costa Rica
Protected areas established in 1991
Geography of Guanacaste Province
Tourist attractions in Guanacaste Province
1991 establishments in Costa Rica